Hosseinabad-e Qasem (also Romanized as Hosseinābād-e Qāsem; also known as Hosseinābād) is a village in Meyghan Rural District, in the Central District of Nehbandan County, South Khorasan Province, Iran. At the 2006 census, its population was 196, in 62 families.

References 

Populated places in Nehbandan County